Chaetocladius suecicus is a species of fly in the family Chironomidae. It is found in the  Palearctic.

References

Chironomidae
Insects described in 1916
Taxa named by Jean-Jacques Kieffer